Attorney General Nicholas may refer to:

George Nicholas (politician) (died 1799), Attorney General of Kentucky
Philip N. Nicholas (1773–1849), Attorney General of Virginia

See also
Joey San Nicolas (born 1973), Attorney General of the Northern Mariana Islands
Herbert Nicholls (1868–1940), Attorney-General of Tasmania